Cauchas anatolica is a moth of the  family Adelidae. It is found in Greece and Turkey.

The wingspan is about 10 mm.

References

Moths described in 1902
Adelidae
Moths of Europe
Moths of Asia